Events in the year 2017 in the Central African Republic.

Incumbents
 President: Faustin-Archange Touadéra 
 Prime Minister: Simplice Sarandji

Events

Central African Republic Civil War (2012–present), ongoing

Deaths
28 April – Edouard Mathos, Roman Catholic bishop (b. 1948).

References

 
2010s in the Central African Republic
Years of the 21st century in the Central African Republic
Central African Republic
Central African Republic